Menominee (YTB‑790) was a United States Navy  named after the Menominee, a Native American tribe in Wisconsin.

Construction
The contract for Menominee was awarded 31 January 1964. She was laid down on 6 September 1966 at Marinette, Wisconsin, by Marinette Marine and launched 3 April 1967.

Operational history
Menominee has performed miscellaneous tugging services for the 5th Naval District, headquartered at Norfolk, Virginia. In the spring of 1971 she was reassigned to Naval Station Mayport, Florida.

Stricken from the Navy Directory 4 September 1998, she was disposed of by Defense Reutilization and Marketing Service (DRMS) by sale for reuse/conversion 27 September 2000. Currently in civilian service as Billy G.

References

  NavSource Online: Service Ship Photo Archive Menominee (YTB-790)

External links
 

Natick-class large harbor tugs
Ships built by Marinette Marine
1967 ships